Mon (Pron:/mɒn/) is a town located in the Mon District of the Indian state of Nagaland.

Geography
It has an average elevation of 655 metres (2,148 feet).

It is situated at an altitude of 2,945 ft (898 m) above sea level. It is at a distance of 357 km from Kohima via Dimapur and 280 km from Dimapur, 275 km from Kohima via Mokokchung, Tamlu and Wakching.  Home of the Konyaks, the town was established at the land of Chi and Mon villages. It is centrally located for the coronation of Anghs (chiefs).

Demographics

 India census, Mon had a population of 16,590 with 9,138 males and 7,452 females. Mon has an average literacy rate of 71%, slightly lower than the national average of 76%: male literacy is 75%, and female literacy is 66%. In Mon, 17% of the population is under 6 years of age.

The Konyaks and the Aos are the two tribes that constitute almost the entire urban population of present-day Mon town.

References

 
Cities and towns in Mon district